The fifth season of Power Couple premiered on Sunday, May 9, 2021, at  on RecordTV.

The show features thirteen celebrity couples living under one roof and facing extreme challenges that will test how well they really know each other. Each week, a couple will be eliminated until the last couple wins the grand prize.

Adriane Galisteu replaced Gugu Liberato as the main host, thus becoming the show's first female host. Actress Lidi Lisboa replaced Flávia Viana and Marcelo Zangrandi as the show's online host and correspondent.

In May 2021, RecordTV announced that various changes would occur with the format. The show will air six times a week (Monday to Saturday) instead of five. At the end of each cycle, viewers at home will determine which two out of the three nominated couples will continue in the game.

The season was originally expected to air in 2020, but production was postponed due to safety concerns resulting from the COVID-19 pandemic.

Matheus Yurley & Mari Matarazzo won the competition with 63.41% of the public vote over Déborah Albuquerque & Bruno Salomão and took home the R$403.000 prize they accumulated during the show. Déborah & Bruno received a brand new car as the runners-up.

Cast
The couples were officially revealed by RecordTV on April 26–30, 2021. On May 6, 2021, reporter Adriana Bombom and Adrien Cunha had withdrawn from competing after Adrien was diagnosed with appendicitis which would require an urgent surgery. Olympic gymnast Dany Hypólito and Fábio Castro were announced as their replacement.

Couples

Future Appearances

After this season, in 2021, Dynho Alves (from Mirella & Dynho) and Fernanda Medrado (from Medrado & Claytão) appeared in A Fazenda 13. Medrado quit the game and finished in 22nd place, while Dynho finished in 6th place.

In 2022, Deborah Albuquerque (from Deborah & Bruno) appeared in A Fazenda 14, she finished in 11th place in the competition.

In 2022, MC Mirella appeared on De Férias com o Ex Caribe: Salseiro VIP as original cast member.

The game
Key

Challenges' results

Notes

Special power
This season, the couples' challenge winning couple also becomes the week's Power Couple. At the nomination ceremony, the couple will randomly picked two out of four film cans from different colors. Then, the couple would be given a choice between two advantages in the game; the couple's choice is marked in bold.

Voting history

Notes

Inheritance power
This season, each eliminated couple will be entitled to an "inheritance". The couple must to delegate, in advance, which couples would hold the Golden film can which will unleash good and bad consequences in the upcoming cycle, with one of the powers defined by the public through the show's profile on R7.com among two options.

Room status

Ratings and reception

Brazilian ratings
All numbers are in points and provided by Kantar Ibope Media.

References

External links
 Power Couple 5 on R7.com

2021 Brazilian television seasons
Power Couple (Brazilian TV series)
Television productions postponed due to the COVID-19 pandemic